Frank Vandenbroucke is the name of:

Frank Vandenbroucke (politician) (born 1955), Belgian politician
Frank Vandenbroucke (cyclist) (1974–2009), Belgian road racing cyclist